KPBB (88.5 FM) was a radio station broadcasting a Spanish Religious format. Licensed to Brownfield, Texas, United States, the station was owned by Paulino Bernal Evangelism. KPBB's license was cancelled on June 26, 2013.

References

External links

PBB
Radio stations established in 1999
Radio stations disestablished in 2013
1999 establishments in Texas
Defunct radio stations in the United States
Defunct religious radio stations in the United States
2013 disestablishments in Texas
PBB